The Dutch Grenadiers were a French Imperial Guard regiment during the Napoleonic Wars. They were originally formed out of Louis Bonaparte's royal guard in the Kingdom of Holland.

Early history
Originally the unit had been raised as Grenadiers of the Royal Guard of Holland in 1806 when Louis Napoleon, brother of Napoleon Bonaparte, was made King of Holland. On July 9, 1810, after the Kingdom of Holland was annexed by the French Empire, the Dutch Grenadiers were incorporated into the French Imperial Guard. Initially numbered 2nd Foot Grenadiers Regiment of the Imperial Guard (2ème Régiment de grenadiers à pied de la Garde impériale), they were part of the Middle Guard. Still dressed in their Dutch white uniforms they marched to Paris where they served for over one and a half years as palace guard. In 1811, when the guard was expanded, the Dutch Grenadiers were renumbered and became the 3rd Foot Grenadiers Regiment.

Uniforms
When the Dutch Grenadiers were added to the Imperial Guard they had worn their original Dutch royal guard uniforms. They were among the few units to use white uniforms in the French Army after the French Revolution. Afterwards the white main colour was kept though numerous adjustments were made. Cuffs, collar and lapels were crimson. The bowl buttons with the Dutch lion on them changed into flat ones with an imperial eagle. The pouch with the standing Dutch lion was changed into one with the imperial eagle as well. The bearskin caps differed with those from the 1st and 2nd Grenadiers of the guard. Those had 45 cm tall bearskins and where thinner while the 3rd had wider 40 cm tall bearskins. Also the Dutch bearskins did not feature the copper plate with a N and an eagle like the other's; instead having no plate at all.

Russian campaign
On August 16, 1812, the Grande Armee arrived at Smolensk, the town being defended by 120,000 Russian troops. By 1 in the morning of August 17 Smolensk was in French hands. The stench of the quickly decaying corpses prevented the Guard from enjoying the pleasures of victory in the town. On the 19th a Russian general, found hiding in the town, refused to surrender and was bayoneted by the Grenadiers. On the 24th, the army began to quit Smolensk, for the Russians were withdrawing to defend Moscow. The Regiment survived Borodino intact, like the rest of the Guard infantry who saw no action even after repeated requests that the Guard would tip the battle in Napoleon’s favour rather than a long drawn-out stalemate. After Krasnoi the 3rd only had 40 men left; and only 7 reached France after the campaign.

References

Regiments of Napoleon I's Imperial Guard
Military units and formations established in 1810
Military units and formations established in 1815
Military units and formations disestablished in 1813
Military units and formations disestablished in 1815
Grenadier regiments
Kingdom of Holland